Fear Factor: Khatron Ke Khiladi Darr Ka Blockbuster Returns is the sixth season of Indian stunt/action based reality show Fear Factor: Khatron Ke Khiladi. The season aired from 7 February 2015 to 12 April 2015.Rohit Shetty was the host of the season. It was won by Aashish Chaudhary. Meiyang Chang was the first Runner-up.

Contestants
This contestants  participated in this season.

Elimination chart

 The contestant win the first stunt and safe from getting fear funda or get winning or second winning point.
 The contestant get into the elimination round.
 The contestant was safe from elimination.
 The contestant has done wild card entry and was not available in the week.
The contestant was eliminated.
 The contestant lost the first stunt and was in pre-elimination round.
 The contestant safe from getting into a elimination round.
 Guest
 Partner in week 7
 Point
 The contestant was in top position.
 The contestant failed to get in top position.DE5D83
 The contestant win ticket to finale.
 The contestant fail to win ticket to finale.
 The contestant was came for only following duration.
 The contestant was winner of the show.
 The contestant was runner-up of the show.

Advantage Hat
In week 7 Aashish Chaudhary was given an advantage hat as he had never gone in elimination round.
The advantage was that he will automatically be safe in the elimination round.
This advantage was only for week 7.

References

External links
 

06
2015 Indian television seasons
Colors TV original programming